The 1969 season in Japanese football.

League tables

Japan Soccer League

Promotion/relegation Series

No relegations.

Team of the Year

References

1969
1
Jap
Jap